is a district of Hanamigawa Ward, Chiba City, Chiba Prefecture, Japan, consisting of 1-chōme to 6-chōme.

Transportation

Railroads
 JR East – Chūō-Sōbu Line
 
 Keisei Electric Railway – Keisei Chiba Line

See also
 Makuhari
 Makuharihongo
 Makuhari-nishi

References

Chiba Prefecture